Santissima Trinità is a Renaissance-style, Roman Catholic church in via Elisa in central Lucca, region of Tuscany, Italy.

History
The church was completed in 1595. It was once affiliated with the Barnabite order of nuns, with an adjacent hospital for the convalescent, and was later affiliated with a Salesian order.

Art and architecture
The design, with a facade with rusticated pilasters and roof-top obelisks, is attributed to Bartolommeo Ammannati or his followers. The church has an elaborate main altar with polychrome marble, and painted architecture. The main altarpiece is the Trinity with Saints John the Baptist, Paolino, Sebastian, Antony, and Catherine by Pietro Paolini. A side altar has a sculpted marble Lactating Madonna (also called Madonna della Tosse or della Latte) by Matteo Civitali. The ceiling has a frescoed oval by Trinity (1595) by Pietro Sorri. Other works lateral to the main altar were completed by Domenico Brugieri circa 1721.

Under the main altar is a glass box with a gilded statue holding relics.

References

Roman Catholic churches in Lucca
Renaissance architecture in Lucca
16th-century Roman Catholic church buildings in Italy
Roman Catholic churches completed in 1595